Loukianos Kilaidonis (: 15 July 1943 – 7 February 2017) was a Greek composer, songwriter and singer.

Biography
Kilaidonis was born at Kypseli, Athens. He studied at the Lycée Léonin of Patissia. He then studied architecture at the Aristotle University of Thessaloniki for 2 years and afterwards returned to Athens where he finished his studies at the National Technical University of Athens. He never did work in architecture because he started a career in music. His first work was the album Our city in 1970. Two years later he made the album Red Thread with Nikos Gatsos and the singers Manolis Mitsias and Dimitra Galani.

The Party in Vouliagmeni 
Kilaidonis organized a large scale concert, the Party in Vouliagmeni, which took place on 25 July 1983, gathering over 70000 people (other estimates place the number at 100000). Also appearing at the Party were Dionysis Savvopoulos, Margarita Zorbala, Vangelis Germanos, George Dalaras, Aphrodite Manou and Mando, reaching the floating stage by speedboats. At a time when the term beach party wasn't particularly well known in Greece, this beach concert managed to cause congestion from Vouliagmeni up to Syngrou Avenue and is considered to be "the Greek Woodstock".

Death 
Kilaidonis died in hospital on 7 February 2017 due to either heart disease or heart failure resulting from a respiratory infection. He was 73.

References

1943 births
2017 deaths
Greek composers
Greek singer-songwriters
Singers from Athens
National Technical University of Athens alumni